Caenocara frontale is a species of anobiid beetle in the family Anobiidae. It is found in North America.

References

Anobiidae
Articles created by Qbugbot
Beetles described in 1905